USS Peoria has been the name of four ships in the United States Navy. They have all been named for Peoria, Illinois.
  was a sidewheel steamer that served in 1867.
  a converted steel gunboat 1898–1921
 , a 

United States Navy ship names